Sarwar may refer to:

Places
Sarwar, Rajasthan, a town in India 
Khuian Sarwar, a village in Punjab, India
Sakhi Sarwar, a town in Punjab, Pakistan
Chowk Sarwar Shaheed Tehsil, in Punjab, Pakistan

People

First name
Sarwar Ahmed, British publisher
Sarwar Ahuja, Indian actor
Sarwar Azam, Bangladeshi general
Sarwar Danish, Afghan politician
Sarwar Hossain, Bangladeshi general
Sarwar Hussain, Indian politician
Sarwar Imran, Bangladeshi cricket coach
Sarwar Jamal Nizam, Bangladeshi politician
Sarwar Sarkhosh, Afghan singer
Sarwar Sultana Begum, Afghan royal consort

Surname or middle name
Adnan Sarwar, Pakistani actor musician
AKM Sarwar Jahan Badsha, Bangladeshi politician
Anas Sarwar, British politician
Ataul Hakim Sarwar Hasan, Bangladeshi general
Azeem Sarwar (broadcaster), Pakistani broadcaster
Azeem Sarwar (badminton), Pakistani badminton player
Beena Sarwar, Pakistani journalist
Chaudhry Mohammad Sarwar, British-Pakistani politician
Chaudhry Muhammad Sarwar Khan, longest serving parliamentarian of Pakistan
Faryadi Sarwar Zardad, Afghan warlord
Golam Sarwar, Bangladeshi writer
Golam Sarwar Hiru, Bangladeshi politician
Gholam Sarwar Husseini, Bengali politician
Ghulam Sarwar, British-Bangladeshi writer
Ghulam Sarwar Khan, Pakistani politician
Ghulam-Sarwar Yousof, Malaysian academic
Kabori Sarwar, Bangladeshi film actress politician
Kazi Sarwar Hossain, Bangladeshi general
Majibur Rahman Sarwar, Bangladeshi politician
Mir Sarwar, Indian actor
Mohammed Sarwar (footballer), Afghan footballer
Mohammad Sarwar (cricketer), Pakistani cricketer
Mohammed Sarwar (murderer), Pakistani murderer
Mohammad Sarwar Ahmadzai, Afghan politician
Muhammad Sarwar Khan, Pakistani politician
Mostofa Sarwar Farooki, Bangladeshi film director
Mufti Ghulam Sarwar Lahori, Pakistani scholar
Muhammad Sarwar (field hockey), Pakistani field hockey player
Muhammad Sarwar Khan, Pakistani politician
Muhammad Shahid Sarwar, Pakistani colonel
Muhammad Shaykh Sarwar, Pakistani-American scholar
Naved Sarwar, Pakistani cricketer
Nazir Muhammad Sarwar Khan, Afghan governor
Nouman Sarwar, Qatar cricketer
Papia Sarwar, Bangladeshi singer
Raja Ashfaq Sarwar, Pakistani politician
Raja Muhammad Sarwar, Pakistani general
Rashid Sarwar, Scottish football player
Samia Sarwar, Pakistani woman
Sehba Sarwar, Pakistani writer
Shah Shahid Sarwar, Bangladeshi politician
Shaimum Sarwar Kamal, Bangladeshi politician
Shehram Sarwar Chaudhary, Pakistani judge
Shoaib Sarwar, UAE cricketer
Sufi Muhammad Sarwar, Pakistani scholar
Usman Sarwar, Pakistani cricketer

Others
Sarwar Shaheed Halt railway station, Pakistan